Pullhair Rubeye is a collaborative studio album released by Animal Collective member Avey Tare (David Portner) and his then-wife  Kría Brekkan (Kristín Anna Valtýsdóttir, formerly of múm). The album was released April 24, 2007 in CD, LP, and digital formats.

Recording
The songs were written in August 2005 in Paris, recorded with guitars and piano on an eight-track during 2006 in their practice space in Brooklyn and later mixed down on a borrowed two track. Just as both were completing the mix, the two track broke down and they didn’t hear the mixes until two months later when they obtained another two track, being surprised by the recorded sounds. The album is based on the live set both played during their shows in 2006 in the US and Iceland, but was released with the songs played backwards, as well as sped up at certain points. According to Portner, the couple took this decision at 21 December 2006 as a result of "a combination of being stuck in NYC for Christmas and seeing that new David Lynch movie", meaning Inland Empire.

Track listing
 "Sis Around the Sándmill" (3:56)
 "Opís Helpus" (8:33)
 "Foetus No-Man" (2:03)
 "Who Wellses in My Hoff" (3:54)
 "Lay Lay Off, Faselam" (3:59)
 "Palenka" (2:49)
 "Sasong" (2:14)
 "Was Ónaíp" (4:10)

References

2007 albums
Avey Tare albums